Breyer may refer to:

People
 Charles Breyer (disambiguation), several people
 Gyula Breyer (1893–1921), Hungarian chess player
 Jim Breyer (born 1961), American venture capitalist
 Johann Breyer (1925–2014), Nazi German genocide criminal 
 Karl Wilhelm Friedrich von Breyer (1771–1818), German historian
 Mirko Breyer (1863–1946), Croatian writer, bibliographer, and antiquarian
 Stephen Breyer (born 1938), Associate Justice of the U.S. Supreme Court
 Tadeusz Breyer (1874–1952), Polish sculptor and medallic artist

Organizations
 Breyer Animal Creations, a company that makes horse figurines
 Breyer State University, an unaccredited, Internet-based entity
 Breyers, a company that makes ice cream

See also
Breyers
Bryer

German-language surnames